Ars-sur-Moselle (literally Ars on Moselle) is a commune in the Moselle department in Grand Est in northeastern France.

History
Ars-sur-Moselle was a part of Germany, in the imperial territory of Alsace-Lorraine, from 1871 to 1918. It was called Ars-an-der-Mosel in German.

Sights
The town has a handsome Roman Catholic church. In the vicinity are the remains of a Roman aqueduct, which formerly spanned the valley.

Population

See also
 Communes of the Moselle department

References

External links
 

Communes of Moselle (department)